German submarine U-291 was a Type VIIC U-boat of Nazi Germany's Kriegsmarine during World War II.

The submarine was laid down on 17 October 1942 at the Bremer Vulkan yard at Bremen-Vegesack as yard number 56. She was launched on 30 June 1943 and commissioned on 4 August under the command of Oberleutnant zur See Hans Keerle.

She carried out no patrols and did not sink or damage any ships.

The boat surrendered on 5 May 1945 at Cuxhaven. She was sunk as part of Operation Deadlight on 20 December 1945.

Design
German Type VIIC submarines were preceded by the shorter Type VIIB submarines. U-291 had a displacement of  when at the surface and  while submerged. She had two shafts and two  propellers.

U-291 was fitted with five  torpedo tubes (four fitted at the bow and one at the stern), fourteen torpedoes, one  SK C/35 naval gun, (220 rounds), one  Flak M42 and two twin  C/30 anti-aircraft guns. The boat had a complement of between forty-four and sixty.

Service history
U-291 served with the 21st U-boat Flotilla for training from 4 to 31 August 1943 and was a Trials boat with the 23rd flotilla from 1 September 1943 until 1 July 1944. She then worked as a 'school' boat from 1 July 1944 to 28 February 1945 with the 21st flotilla once more. Her last assignment was with the 31st flotilla from 1 March to 8 May 1945.

The submarine capitulated at Cuxhaven on 5 May 1945.

References

Bibliography

External links

German Type VIIC submarines
U-boats commissioned in 1943
U-boats sunk in 1945
World War II submarines of Germany
1943 ships
Ships built in Bremen (state)
Operation Deadlight
Maritime incidents in December 1945